Grzegorz Piotr Janik (born 27 June 1965 in Rybnik) is a Polish politician. He was elected to the Sejm on 25 September 2005, getting 4,417 votes in 30 Rybnik district, as a candidate from the Law and Justice list.

See also
Members of Polish Sejm 2005-2007

External links
Grzegorz Janik - parliamentary page - includes declarations of interest, voting record, and transcripts of speeches.

1965 births
Living people
People from Rybnik
Members of the Polish Sejm 2005–2007
Law and Justice politicians
Members of the Polish Sejm 2007–2011
Members of the Polish Sejm 2011–2015